The 2001 V8 Supercar 1000 was the fifth running of the Australia 1000 race, first held after the organisational split over the Bathurst 1000 that occurred in 1997. It was the 44th race that traces its lineage back to the 1960 Armstrong 500 held at Phillip Island.

It was held on 7 October 2001 at the Mount Panorama Circuit just outside Bathurst and was Round 11 of the 2001 Shell Championship Series for V8 Supercars.

Entry List

Results

Qualifying

Top-Fifteen Shootout

Starting grid

Race

Championship Standings

References

Statistics
 Provisional Pole Position - #5 Glenn Seton - 2:09.6770
 Pole Position - #4 Marcos Ambrose - 2:09.7785
 Fastest Lap - #600 Simon Wills - 2:10.2011 (new lap record)
 Average Speed - 146 km/h

External links
 Official race results
 Official V8 Supercar website
 CAMS Manual reference to Australian titles
 race results
 2001 V8 Supercar 1000 images from www.v8supercar.com.au

V8Supercar 1000
Motorsport in Bathurst, New South Wales